Music from Here is an album of instrumental rock music by Ronnie Montrose.

Track listing 
 "Mr. Walker " (Ronnie Montrose) - 4:01
 "Primary Function" (Montrose, Michele Graybeal, Craig McFarland) - 4:05
 "Largemouth" (Montrose, Graybeal, McFarland) - 5:12 
 "Road to Reason" (Montrose, Graybeal, McFarland) - 4:37 
 "Life After Life" (Montrose, Graybeal, McFarland) - 6:29
 "Fear Not" (Montrose) - 5:16
 "Indigo Spheres" (Montrose, Graybeal, McFarland) - 4:58
 "Braindance " (Montrose, Graybeal, McFarland) - 5:53
 "Specialist " (Montrose) - 4:31
 "Walk Softly" (Montrose) - 3:28
 "Wish in One Hand" (Montrose, Graybeal, McFarland) - 3:59

Personnel
Ronnie Montrose – guitar
Michele Graybeal - drums and percussion
Craig McFarland – bass

Production
Produced by Ronnie Montrose
Engineered by Tom Carr

References
Ronnie Montrose; "Music From Here" liner notes; Fearless Urge Records 1994
[ All Music Guide]

1994 albums
Ronnie Montrose albums